Ilavelpu is a 1956 Telugu-language drama film, produced by L. V. Prasad under the Lakshmi Productions banner and directed by D. Yoganand. It stars Akkineni Nageswara Rao, Anjali Devi and Jamuna, with music composed by Susarla Dakshina Murthy. The film is a remake of the Tamil film Edhir Paradhathu (1954). The film was a box office hit.

Plot 
Kantha Rao (Gummadi) is a landlord and a widower, his son Shekar (Akkineni Nageswara Rao) studies for B.A..  Shekar uncle's Mukunda Rao's (Dr. Sivaramakrishnayya) daughter Sarala (Jamuna) loves him. But Sarala's mother Seshamma (Suryakantham) is a very aggressive woman and Shekar stays away from his uncle's family thinking that Sarala might have her mother's qualities. Sarala's brother (Relangi) roams outside the house in order to escape the torture of his mother. Kantha Rao's lands are tilled by Chandrayya (A. L. Narayana) and his daughter is Sarada (Anjali Devi). Sharada grows up in an ashram as her mother dies in her childhood. She is well versed in Sanskrit and Telugu along with having spiritual ideologies. Once, Shekar visits the ashram and meets Sharada there. He respects her ideologies, falls in love and proposes to her. Sharada says that she also admires Shekar, but in a way a fellow human being is liked, but not love. Instead of giving up, Shekar repeatedly requests her to accept his love. Sharada finally says she would talk to her parents and let him know. When Shekar leaves for China to study further, his flight meets with an accident. Everybody thinks he has died in that accident. Sharada and Sarala get distraught with the news and the story takes a huge twist. Sharada gets forced to marry Sekhar's father Kantha Rao in dramatic circumstances. This is when Shekar saves himself from the accident and returns. He feels shocked seeing his lover in the position of the mother in the house. Sharada requests Shekar to marry Sarala and makes him agree to the wedding. But Sarala has her own suspicions about Shekar and Sharada and always thinks they both have something else in mind. Shekar gets upset with this and leaves the house. Sharada gives her life in sacrifice and Shekar and Sarala unite again – eventually making the house a paradise again. Sharada gets all the prayers as the family deity (Ilavelpu) of the house.

Cast 
 Akkineni Nageswara Rao as Sekhar
 Anjali Devi as Sharada
 Jamuna as Sarala
 Gummadi as Kantha Rao
 Relangi
 Ramana Reddy as Govinda Rao
 Chalam as Mohan
 R. Nageswara Rao as Nannagaru
 Dr. Sivaramakrishnaiah as Mukunda Rao
 Padmanabham as Chitti
 Allu Ramalingaiah as Manager
 Suryakantham as Seshamma
 Krishna Kumari as Padma
 Surabhi Kamalabai

Soundtrack 

Music composed by Susarla Dakshinamurthi.

References

External links 

Indian drama films
1956 films
1950s Telugu-language films
Films scored by Susarla Dakshinamurthi
Indian black-and-white films
Telugu remakes of Tamil films
Films directed by D. Yoganand
1956 drama films